Johanneskyrkan, Johannes kyrka, or variants thereof, may refer to:

Finland
St. John's Church, Helsinki

Sweden
Saint John's Church, Habo
St. John's Church, Malmö
St. John's Church, Stockholm

See also 
St. John's Church (disambiguation)